State Trunk Highway 161 (often called Highway 161, STH-161 or WIS 161) is a  state highway in Portage and Waupaca counties in the central part of the US state of Wisconsin. It runs in east–west from US Highway 10 (US 10) northwest of Amherst Junction via Iola to WIS 22/WIS 110 just west of Symco.

Route description

Starting at US 10 between Custer and Amherst Junction, WIS 161 begins to proceed eastward. It then passes Nelsonville and then New Hope. In Iola, WIS 161 briefly runs concurrently with WIS 49. Continuing eastward, WIS 161 then ends at WIS 22/WIS 110 near Symco.

History
Initially, in 1923, WIS 161 traveled from WIS 18 (later US 10; now CTH-KK) Amherst Junction to WIS 22 near Symco. Then, in 1926, with the creation of US 10 and the removal of WIS 18, WIS 161 was truncated from Amherst Junction to Nelsonville. This was done in favor of US 10's direct connection to Nelsonville. Later, US 10 lost its connection to Nelsonville and instead bypassed it. As a result, WIS 161 extended west to US 10's new alignment. WIS 161's former connection was then transferred to local control (replaced by CTH-A, now CTH-Q). However, by 1935, that change was reverted.

In 1951, WIS 161 was then reverted to its original routing as a result of US 10's reversion to its 1927–1935 routing. Since 2007, WIS 161 has moved off from Amherst Junction.

Major intersections

See also

References

External links

161
Transportation in Portage County, Wisconsin
Transportation in Waupaca County, Wisconsin
U.S. Route 10